is a retired female medley swimmer from Japan, who represented her native country twice at the Summer Olympics: in 1992 and 1996. She is best known for winning the silver medal in the Women's 400m Individual Medley at the 1995 Summer Universiade in Fukuoka, behind her team mate Fumie Kurotori.

References
 

1973 births
Living people
Japanese female medley swimmers
Olympic swimmers of Japan
Swimmers at the 1992 Summer Olympics
Swimmers at the 1996 Summer Olympics
People from Hokkaido
Asian Games medalists in swimming
Universiade medalists in swimming
Asian Games bronze medalists for Japan
Swimmers at the 1994 Asian Games
Medalists at the 1994 Asian Games
Universiade silver medalists for Japan
Medalists at the 1995 Summer Universiade
20th-century Japanese women
21st-century Japanese women